Jo Willems is a Belgian cinematographer. Growing up in Westerlo outside Antwerp, he studied film at the LUCA School of Arts, before he relocated to the United Kingdom at the age of 21. He made his feature film cinematography debut with Hard Candy (2005) directed by David Slade, with whom Willems would also collaborate with again on 30 Days of Night (2007). Willems would reunite with music video director Francis Lawrence on The Hunger Games: Catching Fire (2013), serving as cinematographer on following installments of the franchise for Lawrence as well as the spy thriller Red Sparrow (2018), the fantasy adventure Slumberland (2022), and three episodes of the Apple TV+ series See (2019–2022).

For his work on the horror film His House (2020), Willems received a nomination for the British Independent Film Award for Best Cinematography.

Filmography

References

External links
Jo Willems at the Internet Movie Database

Belgian cinematographers
People from Westerlo
Year of birth missing (living people)
Belgian expatriates in the United Kingdom
Living people